Agelastes is a small genus of birds in the guineafowl family. It comprises two species:
 White-breasted guineafowl, A. meleagrides
 Black guineafowl, A. niger

References

 
Bird genera
Taxa named by Charles Lucien Bonaparte